Robert Barrington "Barry" Scott (9 October 1916 – 6 April 1984) was an Australian cricketer. He played first-class cricket for Victoria between 1935 and 1940 and for New South Wales in 1940-41.

Cricket career
A tall, powerfully built right-arm fast bowler and hard-hitting left-handed lower-order batsman, Scott's best season was 1938-39, when he took 23 wickets at an average of 22.39, including figures of 7 for 33 and 5 for 46 when Victoria beat New South Wales in a Sheffield Shield match in Sydney. At the end of the 1939-40 season he was selected to open the bowling for The Rest against New South Wales. He was considered one of Australia's most promising young fast bowlers immediately before World War II.

He had a vigorous run-up and peculiar bowling action. The Cricketer's Australian correspondent noted in early 1939: "He has a whirlwind arm action; just before delivery his left elbow points skyward while the right hand begins its sweep from the region of the left armpit, the general effect being heightened by a lock of black hair which flops, Hitler fashion, across his brow."

Life outside cricket
Scott was educated at Wesley College and at Melbourne University, where he studied Arts and Law. He married Yvonne Evans in Melbourne in May 1940. 

He served in the Army in World War II as a private. After the war he became a prominent advertising executive in Melbourne. In the early 1950s he was an assistant trade commissioner in New York.

See also
 List of Victoria first-class cricketers
 List of New South Wales representative cricketers

References

External links
 

1916 births
1984 deaths
People educated at Wesley College (Victoria)
University of Melbourne alumni
Australian cricketers
New South Wales cricketers
Victoria cricketers
Cricketers from Melbourne
Australian military personnel of World War II
D. G. Bradman's XI cricketers